Methylobacterium bullatum  is a Gram-negative, facultatively methylotrophic, strictly aerobic and non-spore-forming bacteria from the genus of Methylobacterium which has been isolated from the moss Funaria hygrometrica in the Bergpark Wilhelmshöhe near Kassel in Germany.

Further reading

References

External links 
Type strain of Methylobacterium bullatum at BacDive -  the Bacterial Diversity Metadatabase

Hyphomicrobiales
Bacteria described in 2012